Margerie Lake Reservoir is a 244 acre lake in New Fairfield, Connecticut. It is a source of drinking water for the Danbury area and is managed by the Danbury Water Department. It has a watershed of 2,942 acres.

History
The area was originally a valley with a smaller body of water named Margerie Pond. The land was marshland, and was referred to as Margerie Swamp. The land was not suitable for development, but was a spot for foraging cranberries. Plans to dam Margerie Creek to create a reservoir started in 1905. Margerie Swamp was purchased for the purposes of creating a reservoir in 1929. Initially there were concerns about the potability of water in Margerie Creek, and opponents thought the project would be too costly. However, construction of the dam began in 1932. 

Margerie Lake Reservoir Dam, a 735 feet long earthfill embankment at the south end of the reservoir, was completed in 1934. A larger earthfill dike was also constructed the north side. At its inception, the reservoir produced five millions gallons of water per day. By 1992, that number was down to two million.

In December 2021, the town of New Fairfield was granted funds for the construction of a 2.5 mile walking trail along the lake.

The reservoir suffers from periodic algae blooms.

References

Lakes of Fairfield County, Connecticut